Brigadier James Roderick Sinclair, 19th Earl of Caithness, CVO, CBE, DSO (29 September 1906 – 8 May 1965) was a British Army officer during World War II and was also chief of Clan Sinclair.

Sinclair joined the Gordon Highlanders and rose to the rank of Brigadier and as such led his regiment (part of the 51st (Highland) Division) through France, Belgium, the Netherlands into Germany during World War II and was decorated with the Distinguished Service Order and made Commander of the Order of the British Empire.

In 1949 he was appointed the first Commander of the Ceylon Army and played a major role in establishing it as a regular army from the volunteer Ceylon Defence Force till 1952. On returning to the UK he was given various postings in England and Scotland before in 1955 being appointed land agent and manager of Her Majesty The Queen's private Estate at Balmoral Castle, Aberdeenshire where he lived until his death. After leaving the army, he was appointed Colonel of his old Regiment the Gordon Highlanders.

Sinclair succeeded his sonless paternal uncle as 19th Earl of Caithness.

His first wife, by whom he had three daughters (Jean, Margaret and Fiona), died during the war and after it, in 1946, he married a widow Gabrielle Ormerod (1912–1990), whose husband had been killed on active service in Africa leaving her with a daughter (Susie). In 1947 while posted to Germany another daughter (Bridget), was born and the next year in Burma, Malcolm, Lord Berriedale was born. Upon his death on 8 May 1965, his son Lord Berriedale became the 20th Earl of Caithness and chief of Clan Sinclair.

References

External links
Former Army commanders
"Hail to the Chief", The Mel Sinclair Clan
Generals of World War II

1906 births
1965 deaths
Earls of Caithness
Commanders of the Order of the British Empire
Companions of the Distinguished Service Order
British Army brigadiers of World War II
Sri Lankan brigadiers
Gordon Highlanders officers
People from British Ceylon
Scottish representative peers
Deputy Lieutenants of Aberdeenshire
Commanders of the Sri Lanka Army